Ahn Ji-ho (born 24 April 1987) is a South Korean football player who plays for Hwaseong FC.

Club career
At the 2008 K League draft, Daejeon Citizen selected him as the first pick, and exchanged him for Lee Dong-won.

International career
Ahn was a member of the South Korea national football team at the 2007 FIFA U-20 World Cup in Canada, but did not appear in any matches.

Club career statistics

References

External links

1987 births
Living people
People from Seoul
Sportspeople from Seoul
Footballers from Seoul
South Korean footballers
Association football defenders
South Korea under-20 international footballers
Daejeon Hana Citizen FC players
Incheon United FC players
Gyeongnam FC players
Goyang Zaicro FC players
Gangwon FC players
Seoul E-Land FC players
K League 1 players
K League 2 players
Yonsei University alumni